is a Japanese freestyle skier. He competed in the men's moguls event at the 1998 Winter Olympics.

References

1976 births
Living people
Japanese male freestyle skiers
Olympic freestyle skiers of Japan
Freestyle skiers at the 1998 Winter Olympics
Sportspeople from Sapporo
20th-century Japanese people